Allan Maxwell Grice  (born 21 October 1942), known to motor-racing fans as "Gricey", is an Australian former racing driver and politician, most famous for twice winning the prestigious Bathurst 1000 (1986 and 1990), and as a privateer driver of a Holden in the Australian Touring Car Championship.

Grice was educated at The Armidale School in northern NSW.

Grice also had a successful second career as a politician and Member for Broadwater in the Queensland Parliament from 1992 to 2001. He currently operates an LPG conversion and importing business – LPGricey Tanks.

Bathurst 1000 record
Grice made 26 starts between 1968 and 2002 ( sixth on the 'most starts' list).

Grice had seven podium finishes at Bathurst: two wins (1986 and 1990), four seconds (1978, 1982, 1991, 1995), and a third (1983). These results put him fifth on the 'most podiums' list for drivers at Bathurst.

Thirteen top 10 finishes (50% of all his starts) (in addition to above, fourth in 1979, seventh in 1980 and 1981, tenth in 1989, fifth in 1992 and seventh in 1994). Grice holds the record for the most Bathurst 1000 drives (16) before first victory (of those who have won).

Bathurst 1986

Driving a Holden VK Commodore SS Group A that was owned by his co-driver, Graeme Bailey and built by his longtime team, Roadways Racing, Grice posted the first 100 mph average lap in a Group A car, backing up his feat of achieving the first 100 mph average lap in a Group C specification Holden VH Commodore in 1982. Grice's time for the 6.172 km circuit in 1986 was a 2:16.16 (compared to his 1982 time of 2:17.8) although he only achieved pole position in 1982.

Grice and Bailey led for all-but 12 laps and Grice drove for 137 of the 163 laps (before the track alterations in response to FIA request reduced the race to 161 laps).

Bathurst 1990

 
British Touring Car Championship legend Win Percy was given the task of reviving the fortunes of the Holden Team in the Australian Touring Car Championship by Tom Walkinshaw, and against Walkinshaw's wishes Percy chose Grice as his co-driver for Bathurst.

With Percy carrying a shoulder injury, Grice did the bulk of the testing and race driving for Bathurst.  Competing against a field that included multiple turbo-charged Ford Sierras, Grice and Percy prevailed to record a famous victory in a Holden VL Commodore SS Group A SV.

Racing career
Though Grice did race, and win, for Holden factory teams in ATCC (most famously in the Bathurst 1000 in 1990), he spent much of his career as a privateer racing in a Holden against the Holden works teams (typically driven by Peter Brock).

Early in his career, Grice was the first racing driver to race the iconic Holden Torana LH SLR/5000 V8 (though he raced the road-version, L31, not the race-bred, Bathurst winning version, L34).

In 1974 Grice began driving for the Craven Mild Racing team and the following year he won a number of rounds in the Australian Touring Car Championship in his SL/R 5000 Torana.

In 1975, Allan Grice put up his strongest challenge for the Australian Touring Car Championship. Grice would have won the championship had he not been disqualified from rounds five, seven and eight. In round five, at Surfers Paradise, Grice won the race but was disqualified following a protest lodged by Holden Dealer Team manager Harry Firth. Firth correctly contended that the thermostat from the Holden V8 engine in Grice's Craven Mild Torana L34 was in fact in the car's glovebox and not where it should have been. This led to speculation that Firth had managed to convince one of Grice's mechanics to put the item in the glovebox in a bid to sabotage his season, which at that point saw Grice leading the points table. Firth's lead driver Colin Bond went on to win the 1975 ATCC. Grice continued the season after appealing the disqualification, but once the appeal was upheld he lost all points from the remaining rounds.

In 1978 Grice broke through with a placing in the Bathurst 1000 when he came second behind Peter Brock in a Craven Mild Racing Holden LX Torana A9X SS5000.

Grice was the winner of the 1978 and 1979 Australian Sports Sedan Championships driving Frank Gardner's Chevrolet Corvair. Grice also finished fourth with open wheel star Alfredo Costanzo in the 1979 Hardie-Ferodo 1000, though he was some nine laps behind the winning HDT Torana of Peter Brock and Jim Richards, with the Craven Mild Torana hatchback, like the rest of the field, not posing a serious threat to Brock.

In 1980 the Craven Mild team began driving a BMW 318i Turbo in the sports sedan series, first in his usual Craven Mild colours, but later in the black and gold of the JPS Team BMW. Grice had little success with the car, constantly battling its handling which was not up to the power of the turbocharged engines. Grice's relationship with team manager Gardner had also deteriorated by this time, resulting in his sacking from the JPS team at the end of 1981. This led to a long-standing animosity between Grice and Gardner which lasted until Gardner's death at the age of 78 in 2009. The crux of the animosity was Gardner allegedly not having a high opinion of Grice's aggressive driving style, while Grice also contends that Gardner stole his longtime Craven A and JPS cigarette sponsorship.

After contemplating giving away racing, with no prospects of a competitive drive, Grice was thrown a lifeline by Re-Car owner Alan Browne. Grice was listed to drive with Browne at Bathurst in 1982 and Grice qualified fastest in the team's Holden VH Commodore. He and Browne  finished second after a duel with the similar Commodore of Peter Brock in the early laps. The following year Grice finished third at Bathurst in an STP sponsored Roadways Commodore shared with Bond.

Grice holds the distinction of winning the last ATCC race held under CAMS locally developed Group C rules when he won the final race of the 1984 ATCC at the Adelaide International Raceway in a Holden VH Commodore. In a closely fought race, Grice finished less than one second in front of Brock's HDT Commodore, with series champion Dick Johnson third in his Ford Falcon, less than a second behind Brock. Grice also won the last competitive Group C race held in Australia when he drove his Roadways Holden VK Commodore to victory in a race held at the Baskerville Raceway in Tasmania in late 1984.

Grice easily won the 1984 Australian GT Championship driving the ex-Bob Jane DeKon Chevrolet Monza that had been acquired by Re-Car boss Alan Browne. Grice and the Monza sat on pole for every round of the series and won all but one race, his only loss was when the Monza lost fuel pressure while holding an eight-second lead over the Porsche Carrera RSR of Peter Fitzgerald on the last lap of round three at Calder Park Raceway. In late 1984 Grice was joined by fellow touring car star Johnson and driver-engineer Ron Harrop in the Monza, when they contested the Sandown 1000 as part of the 1984 World Endurance Championship. The race was the first ever world championship road race held in Australia. Running in the special "AC Class" (for cars in the Australian GT and sports car championships), Grice qualified the car 18th and second in class, 1.9 seconds shy of the 1984 Australian Sports Car Championship winning Romano WE84-Cosworth driven by Alfredo Costanzo (and almost nine seconds slower than Stefan Bellof's pole time in his Rothmans Porsche 956). The Monza ran strongly, with Grice reporting that the  6.0 L Chevrolet was able to stay with the faster Porsches on the straights, but lost out to the ground effect sports cars through the turns (Johnson claimed that the car had a lot more grunt than its handling deserved, though Grice contended that the Monza handled very well). The Monza was eventually disqualified from the race for receiving outside assistance.

During 1984 Grice also competed in the 24 Hours of Le Mans. Driving a Charles Ivey Racing prepared Porsche 956, with co-drivers Alain de Cadenet and Chris Craft, the car was qualified 32nd, but was a DNF with engine failure after 274 laps. Grice, who proved the fastest of the trio despite never having raced at Le Mans or in a 956, was openly critical of the team and their preparation of the car which had a bad habit of losing wheels at high speed. After the Porsche lost a wheel early in the race (before his first driving stint), Grice was heard to say loud enough for everyone in the team to hear that he had race cars at home that did not shed wheels.

Though best remembered for his endurance race feats, Grice was a very fast driver. Driving as a privateer, he was the first driver to record a 100 mph laps around Bathurst in both a Group C car 1982 and in a Group A car 1986 (that time on his way to winning Bathurst).

In 1987 Grice became the first Australian driver to qualify for NASCAR's Coca-Cola 600 at the Charlotte Motor Speedway. Gricey was also prominent in the early NASCAR races held in Australia, held in 1988 at the then new, A$54 million Calder Park Thunderdome owned by former racer and prominent businessman Bob Jane. Grice qualified his Foster's sponsored Oldsmobile Delta 88 third for the 1988 Goodyear NASCAR 500 at the Thunderdome, the first ever NASCAR race held outside of North America. His race ended on lap 80 when he was caught up in a crash that he could not avoid due to the Oldsmobile having lost its brakes. Grice suffered a broken collar bone in the high speed crash. The race itself was dominated by visiting Winston Cup drivers Neil Bonnett, Bobby Allison and Dave Marcis, with Bonnett eventually winning from fellow Alabama Gang member Allison by just 0.86 seconds.

In 1990, Grice and his old Roadways touring car team led by team boss and chief mechanic Les Small, developed a left-hand-drive Holden VN Commodore powered by a 358 cubic inch Chevrolet V8 engine to run in the Australian NASCAR series, with Grice taking several wins at both the Thunderdome and the 1/2 mile Speedway Super Bowl at the Adelaide International Raceway. Grice, Small and Bob Jane also formed a plan to take the Commodore to America to run in the Winston Cup], though ultimately the plans were shelved.

In 1988, thanks to his friendship with his 1987 James Hardie 1000 co-driver Percy, Grice was drafted into the Nissan Motorsport Europe team for the European Touring Car Championship, driving a Nissan Skyline HR31 GTS-R. Percy, Grice, and Swedish driver Anders Olofsson, drove the car to sixth outright in the 1988 Spa 24 Hours. The Nissan Europe team was managed by former Ford Works Team and later Nissan Australia team boss from the Australian Group C days, Howard Marsden. Grice also won the inaugural Bathurst 12 Hour held in 1991 driving a Toyota Supra Turbo with Peter Fitzgerald and Nigel Arkell.

Grice last competed in a full ATCC was in 1987. He was signed by Pinnacle Motorsport to complete the full 1995 season, although the relationship was severed mid-year. Grice's final ATCC race was at the 1995 Oran Park round driving a Ford EF Falcon for Glenn Seton Racing. Grice ended his career having won ten rounds in the Australian Touring Car Championship (equal 12th on list of round winners).

Grice continued to compete as an endurance co-driver, his last appearance was at the 2002 Bathurst 1000 driving a Ford AU Falcon entered by V8 Ute series team Nilsson Motorsport. The Bathurst start, some five years after his previous start, rekindled Grice as a racing driver and he made a comeback to racing in the V8 Utes series driving Falcon XR8s and forming his own team. He was competitive, winning races with a championship position high of sixth.

Since stepping away from the drivers seat Grice remains a familiar sight at historic racing events as well as supporting the racing career of his son, Benjamin Grice.

Career results

Complete Australian Touring Car Championship results
(key) (Races in bold indicate pole position) (Races in italics indicate fastest lap)

Complete World Sportscar Championship results
(key) (Races in bold indicate pole position) (Races in italics indicate fastest lap)

Complete European Touring Car Championship results
(key) (Races in bold indicate pole position) (Races in italics indicate fastest lap)

Complete World Touring Car Championship results
(key) (Races in bold indicate pole position) (Races in italics indicate fastest lap)

Complete South Pacific Touring Car Championship results
(key) (Races in bold indicate pole position) (Races in italics indicate fastest lap)

Complete Asia-Pacific Touring Car Championship results
(key) (Races in bold indicate pole position) (Races in italics indicate fastest lap)

Complete British Touring Car Championship results
(key) (Races in bold indicate pole position) (Races in italics indicate fastest lap)

NASCAR
(key) (Bold – Pole position awarded by qualifying time. Italics – Pole position earned by points standings or practice time. * – Most laps led.)

Winston Cup Series

Complete Bathurst 500/1000 results

Complete Sandown Endurance results

Complete 24 Hours of Le Mans results

Complete Spa 24 Hour results

Complete Bathurst 12 Hour results

Complete Bathurst 24 Hour results

References

External links
VESRIX, Drivers record – Allan Grice
Racing Sports Car Archive

1942 births
20th-century Australian politicians
21st-century Australian politicians
24 Hours of Le Mans drivers
24 Hours of Spa drivers
Australian Formula 2 drivers
Australian sportsperson-politicians
Australian Touring Car Championship drivers
Bathurst 1000 winners
British Touring Car Championship drivers
Living people
NASCAR drivers
National Party of Australia members of the Parliament of Queensland
People from Maitland, New South Wales
Racing drivers from New South Wales
Recipients of the Medal of the Order of Australia
Supercars Championship drivers
World Sportscar Championship drivers
World Touring Car Championship drivers
Australian Endurance Championship drivers
Schnitzer Motorsport drivers
Nismo drivers
Dick Johnson Racing drivers